Portrait of Madame Recamier (French: Portrait de Madame Récamier ) is a painting by French artist Antoine-Jean Gros from about 1825.

Description
The picture is painted in oil on canvas and has dimensions of 62.3 x 51.2 cm.

The portrait is in the Romantic style. It presents Madame Recamier in her middle age. A great beauty of her time, she had been portrayed in her youth by Jacques-Louis David and François Gérard, at the time when she was leading a cosmopolitan life in Paris while residing at the consulate in the city. She was known for her lavish soirees at the Palace of Rue Mont Blanc, which were attended contemporary artists, writers, actors and politicians. The portrait was painted later, but shows her fair features and graceful hands folded under her chest.

Provenance
The painting was exhibited in Strossmayer Gallery, in Zagreb. It is owned by the Croatian Academy of Sciences and Arts in Zagreb. It was donated in 1903 by French nobleman Eugène-Emmanuel-Ernst Halvin, Marquis Penn.

References

1825 paintings
Paintings by Antoine-Jean Gros
Portraits of women